Tom Florence (born 20 May 1998 in New Zealand) is a New Zealand rugby union player who plays for the  in Super Rugby. He also plays for the New Orleans Gold in Major League Rugby (MLR). His playing position is flanker. He was named in the squad for round 10 of the Highlanders Super Rugby Aotearoa competition.

Reference list

External links
itsrugby.co.uk profile

1998 births
New Zealand rugby union players
Living people
Rugby union flankers
Taranaki rugby union players
Highlanders (rugby union) players
Chiefs (rugby union) players
New Orleans Gold players